A social bookmarking website is a centralized online service that allows users to store and share Internet bookmarks. Such a website typically offers a blend of social and organizational tools, such as annotation, categorization, folksonomy-based tagging, social cataloging and commenting.  The website may also interface with other kinds of services, such as citation management software and social networking sites.

Defunct sites

See also
Comparison of enterprise bookmarking platforms
List of social software
List of social networking services
Comparison of reference management software
Social network aggregation

Notes and references 

 
bookmarking websites
Social bookmarking
Social bookmarking websites